The Mezhovskaya culture (mistranscribed as Meshovskaya culture) is an archaeological culture of the late Bronze Age (13th to the beginning of the 7th century BCE). It was localized in the Southern Urals and named after the village of Mezhovka on the banks of the Bagaryak river in the northern part of the Chelyabinsk Oblast.

The ancestors of the Mezhovskaya culture were the people of the Cherkaskul culture with the participation of the people of the Tobol taiga, with traditions and ceramics of the steppe zone of the Ural and Kazakhstan (Andronovo culture), especially the Sargarino-Alexis culture.

The Mezhovskaya culture reflects the further stages of development of the Ugric community in active contact with the Indo-Iranian population of the Ural steppes.

Origin
The Mezhovskaya culture was composed of a mixed population of Indo-European (Andronovo culture) and Ugrian (Cherkaskul culture) tribes.

Genetics

In 2015, a genetic study of ancient dwellings of the Mezhovskaya culture was made of people found at the Kapova Cave (Shulgan-tash). Three individuals (RISE523, RISE524, RISE525) of the Mezhovskaya in Southern Ural from 1400 BC to 1000 BC were studied. Extractions of Y-DNA from one individual was determined to belong to the haplogroup R1a1a1 (kit RISE525: Meshovskaya, SNPs: Z645, Z283(-? false negative)>Z282>Z280>CTS1211>YP343>YP340>YP371>Y11162 (Y11175 level Y11162), Y11175+ Y11171-), while the other extractions were determined to belong to R1b (kit RISE524: Meshovskaya, SNPs: R1b1a2-PF6494), which historians had thought were the result of migrations of early Indo-Europeans from the Black Sea to Siberia and Middle Asia via the Urals.

The autosomal genetics does not seem to have died out.

Stages
The Mezhovskaya culture developed through two stages: 
 The Mezhovsky stage (13th-9th centuries b.c.)  
 The Berezovsky stage (8th-7th century b.c.).

The dwellings
Dwellings were excavated at Mezhovka, Kapova cave, Berezovka and other locations.

The dwellings were unfortified with an area of 1 - 35 sq. m., and were more likely to occur in the forest-steppe of the Urals, and rarely in the Ural forests proper. The number of dwellings ranged from 1 to 10–15. They were usually shallow huts built with frame-pillar design.

The Mezhovsky culture had a diversified economy with a combination of production (especially cattle, metal) and assigns (hunting, fishing, gathering) forms of economy.

Cemeteries were small in size (up to 36 graves) and are found mainly in the forest-steppe regions of Bashkortostan. Most were composed of earthen mounds over elongated holes in the ground, with corpses on their backs with the head to the west-northwest. Cremation was rare. Equipment was often included in the graves, usually vessels, less often tools and weapons, and the remains of the funerary feasts.

The Mezhovsky culture exemplified the final phase of the Bronze Age of Ural forest zone and had a significant influence on the formation of the transition of the Ural cultures from the Bronze Age to the early Iron Age.

References

History of Ural
Bronze Age cultures of Asia
Indo-European archaeological cultures
Finno-Ugric archaeological cultures
Archaeological cultures in Russia
Archaeological cultures of Northern Asia